Nimat Hamoush (نعمت الحاموش) is a Lebanese writer and storyteller that has published multiple novels and collections of short stories through Al Dar Al Arabia publishing and distribution. One of her famous novels is "The Man and The Monster" where she talked about many matters such as, writing, men, women, and the relationship between the three of them. She also has published “Khawater Joroh” which is an assemblage of short stories that included a number of poems by the Hamoush. As well as "Mirsah Fi Alraml" which was published by the same publishing company. Her most famous novel was "My Angel" which was published in 2019 and has around 129 pages.

Career 
"The Man and the Monster": Published in 2014 with 189 pages. The novel was written about writing in the battle with life. As the woman tries to reclaim her position while taking control over the man using writing.

Nimat Hamoush wrote this novel in a way of tangling poetic views and narrative values to articulate a number of matters. Matters that include love, life, and real-life characters. Hamoush briefly summed up the history of women in the middle east as well as she tried to save the narrative as it is in an interview later. She referenced in the novel women in every era and place and specified women's relationships with men. Nimat wrote in the introduction of the novel answers about a number of questions about women and others regarding Arabic narrative.

Her second piece titled "Khawater Joroh" which is a book published by Al Dar Al Arabia publishing and distribution in 2016 with 136 pages. This book was considered a collection of short stories as it included many poems by the writer that were previously written but not published. In collaboration with the same publishing company, Nimat published her third book in 2017. "Mirsat Fi Alraml" her third novel was classified in the thriller and adventure genre, and it had 174 pages.  Nimat Hamoush described this novel as a story of strange disappointments, a story of unique impulse that prisons the person in a specific, place and moment as it ties his hands and keeps him where he is.

Her most famous novel by the writer "Malaki" or "My Angel" is also a thriller and adventure piece. The book was published by the same publishing company previously mentioned in 2019 with 125 pages. The book tells the story of “Raji” the protagonist of the novel. As "Raji" was left to swim in the light of his dream, the silence of his angel and his unanswered questions until he was able to see the world through the eyes of his lover that he named “Al Ghariba”. She was closer to him than he was to himself as the writer described him in the novel. The protagonist realized that the story is strange he decided to start writing day and night, as he wrote the most unique love story. Nimat explained why she thinks this book is special and different than feminist literature as it describes men emotions rather than women's emotions. As well as she has created a structure that benefits from the blend of literary arts and novel text such as the poem of prose. She has also used the dream narrative as she built the story on a mixture of dreams and reality.

Works 
These are the notable works of Nimat Al Hamoush
 The Man and the Monster
 Khawater Joroh
 Mirsat Fi Alraml
 My Angel

References 

Women's fiction
Lebanese women writers
Lebanese women short story writers
Literature by women
Lebanese writers
Year of birth missing (living people)
Living people